AIK Bandy is the Bandy section of sports club Allmänna Idrottsklubben, currently located in Solna, which is just north of Stockholm.  Former UEFA President and FIFA Vice President Lennart Johansson started as a leader here.

Men's team
The men's team was started in 1905.

In the first year of bandy league system in Sweden, 1930–31, AIK entered in Division 1 Norra together with
Hammarby IF, IF Vesta, IFK Rättvik, IK Sirius, Skutskärs IF, SK Tirfing, and Västerås SK and finished 1st. AIK then won the Championship final against the winner of Division 1 Södra, IF Göta, with 4–3 and became Swedish Champions.

AIK previously played at Spånga Idrottspark. Starting with the 2007 season they play at Bergshamra IP. AIK are not as successful in the bandy section as they are in ice hockey and football in recent years but they are still in the third level of the Swedish bandy league system, the league they play in is Division 2 Norra Svealand. The clubs also has a second team who are called Gnaget BK and play one level down the Swedish bandy league system. The club was successful in the early years of the Swedish championship.

The team has gotten promoted to Elitserien 2019-20.

Honours

Domestic
 Swedish Champions:
 Winners (3): 1909, 1914, 1931
 Runners-up (4): 1913, 1915, 1917, 2021

International
 Nordic Games:
 Winners (1): 1913

Women's team

The women's team is very successful having won the women's championship eleven times.

Honours
Women's Swedish masters

References

External links
Official website
Supporterclub website

 
Bandy clubs in Sweden
Sport in Stockholm
Bandy clubs established in 1891
1891 establishments in Sweden